Pestka is a Polish-language surname meaning literally "kernel". Notable people with the surname include:

Kamil Pestka (born 1998), Polish footballer
Sidney Pestka (1936–2016), American biochemist and geneticist
Stanisław Pestka (1929–2015), Kashubian poet
Steve Pestka (born 1951), American politician, attorney, and businessman

See also
 

Polish-language surnames